Nonna Alexandrovna Muravyova (August 13, 1906, Kamenka, Kineshemsky Uyezd, Kostroma Governorate, Russian Empire – January 2, 1986, Moscow, Russian Soviet Federative Socialist Republic) was a Soviet state, party and public figure, Minister of Social Security of the Russian Soviet Federative Socialist Republic (1952–1961), Chairman of the Central Auditing Commission of the Communist Party of the Soviet Union (1961–1966).

Early career
Born into a working-class family.

In 1920–1923, she worked at a dyeing and finishing factory in Kamenka. Here she joined the Russian Communist Youth Union, in 1923–1926 – at a linen factory in Novopistsovo.

Member of the All–Union Communist Party (Bolsheviks) since 1926. In 1938, she graduated from the All–Union Industrial Academy of Light Industry Named After Vyacheslav Molotov.

In 1926–1930, she was a teacher at the orphanage "Communa No. 1", which was first located in Vichuga, and then was transferred to Staraya Vichuga.

Since 1930 – at party work.
1930–1931 – Head of the Mass Propaganda Sector of the party organization of the Krasin Factory in Staraya Vichuga;
1931 – Instructor of the women's department of the Ivanovo Regional Committee of the All–Union Communist Party (Bolsheviks);
1932–1934 – Head of the women's department of the Ivanovo Regional Committee of the All–Union Communist Party (Bolsheviks).

In leadership positions

1938–1939 – Director of the Spinning and Weaving Factory "Hammer and Sickle" (Pushkino, Moscow Region);
1939–1944 – Deputy People's Commissar of Light Industry of the Russian Soviet Federative Socialist Republic;
1944–1946 – Director of the Research Institute of Popular Fiber;
1946–1952 – Chairman of the Central Committee of the Trade Union of Textile Workers;
1952–1961 – Minister of Social Security of the Russian Soviet Federative Socialist Republic;
1961–1966 – Chairman of the Central Auditing Commission of the Communist Party of the Soviet Union;
1961–1966 – Chairman of the Commission for the Establishment of Personal Pensions Under the Council of Ministers of the Soviet Union.

Since July 1966 – Member of the Party Control Committee under the Central Committee of the Communist Party of the Soviet Union.

Member of the Central Auditing Commission of the Communist Party of the Soviet Union (1956–1971). Deputy of the Supreme Soviet of the Soviet Union of the 6th Convocation. Deputy of the Supreme Soviet of the Russian Soviet Federative Socialist Republic of the 3–5th Convocations.

Since 1974 – retired. She was Deputy Chairman of the Society of Soviet–Finnish Friendship and Cultural Relations, a member of the Committee of Soviet Women.

In 1982, the Nonna Muravyova Prize was established in Vichuga, awarded to the best women activists of the city.

She was buried at the Novodevichy Cemetery.

Awards and titles
Order of the Red Banner of Labour (August 15, 1956);
Order of the Badge of Honour (July 20, 1940) – for overfulfillment of the 1939 Plan, successful work and initiative in fulfilling special orders of the Government (for light industry);
Three more orders;
Medals;
Honorary citizen of Vichuga.

References

Sources
Nonna Muravyova. "New Law on Pensions", Moscow, State Publishing House of Political Literature, 1956
Social Security in the Soviet Union (Report by Nonna Muravyova, Minister of Social Security of the Russian Soviet Federative Socialist Republic), Moscow, 1956
Sergey Gorbunov, Yu. S. Lyubichev. "Proud Destiny" (Documentary Sketch About the Life And Work of Nonna Muravyova), Yaroslavl, Verkhne–Volzhsky Publishing House, 1992
Buravina E. V. Review of Documents of the Fund of Statesman and Public Figure Nonna Muravyova (1900–1986) According to Documents of the State Archives of the Russian Federation: Thesis / Russian State University for the Humanities – Moscow, 1995
Obituary // "Pravda", 1986, No. 4 of January 4

1906 births
1986 deaths
Burials at Novodevichy Cemetery
Recipients of the Order of Lenin
Recipients of the Order of the Red Banner of Labour
People from Vichuga
Sixth convocation members of the Supreme Soviet of the Soviet Union
Soviet women in politics
Women government ministers